Charlotte Frogner (born 9 April 1981) is a Norwegian actress, best known outside of Norway for her role in the Norwegian zombie film Dead Snow. She has been employed by Oslo's Det Norske Teatret since 2004 where she has appeared in a number of productions and acted for Norwegian television. From 28 July to 7 August 2010, Charlotte Frogner played Ingrid / Anitra / the Greenclad woman at the Peer Gynt performance at Lake Gaalaa.

Filmography 
 Nora (2006) – Nora
 Noen ganger gjør det vondt (2006) – Anette
 5 løgner / Five Lies (2007) – Kristin
 Død Snø / Dead Snow (2009) – Hanna Delon
 Brave – Merida
 Død Snø 2 / Dead Snow 2: Red vs. Dead (2014) – Hanna Delon
 Hotel Transylvania 3: Summer Vacation – Ericka
 Helt Super (2022) – Mother

Television 
 Maria (previously known as Hvaler) (2008) – Maria Blix, 12 episodes
 Jul i Tøyengata (2006) – Barnehagetante
 Side om side (2013–2019) Celine Kopperud, 57 episodes

Theater 
 Natalie i Next to Normal (2010)
 Masja i Eit lykkeleg sjølvmord (2009)
 Evig ung (2009)
 Jesus Christ Superstar (2009) – Maria Magdalena
 Få meg på, for faen / Get me the fuck up (2007)
 Lærde damer (2007)
 Richard II (2007) – Dronning Isabel
 Richard III (2007) – Lady Anne
 Helten på den grøne øya / Hero of the green island (2006)
 Danse samba med meg / Dance samba with me (2006)
 Det folk vil ha (2005)
 Frank (2005)
 Piaf (2004)

References

External links 
 

Actor Details page from Det Norske Teatret

1981 births
Living people
People from Aurskog-Høland
Norwegian film actresses
Norwegian stage actresses
Norwegian television actresses